The Czech Cup, officially known as the MOL Cup for sponsorship reasons, is the major men's football cup competition in the Czech Republic. It is organised by the Czech Football Association.

The Czech Cup was first held in 1961. The winner would then face the winner of the Slovak Cup in the Czechoslovak Cup final. This competition was discontinued in 1993, after the dissolution of Czechoslovakia into two independent states (Czech Republic and Slovakia).

The winner gains entry to the following season's UEFA Europa League.

Finals of the Czech Cup

Performance by club

Historical names 
 1993–2000 – Pohár Českomoravského fotbalového svazu (Pohár ČMFS)
 2000–2002 – Raab Karcher Cup
 2002–2009 – Pohár Českomoravského fotbalového svazu (Pohár ČMFS)
 2009–2012 – Ondráškovka Cup
 2012–2014 – Pohár České pošty
 2014–2015 – Pohár Fotbalové asociace České republiky (Pohár FAČR)
 2015–now – MOL Cup

See also
 Czechoslovak Cup
 Czech Women's Cup

References 

 Football Cup at ČMFS website
 League321.com – National cup results.

External links
Czech Republic – List of Cup Finals, RSSSF.com
Czech Cup summary – Soccerway

 
National association football cups
Cup